California Brainstorm  is a live album by the British space rock group Hawkwind, recorded during their North America tour in 1990, and released in 1992 in the USA on the Iloki label.

In 1994 it received a UK release by Cyclops, which included the extra track "Images" and was also available in limited boxset containing Robert Godwin's book A Collector's Guide to Hawkwind.

The full track listing is now also available as an extra CD on a re-release of Palace Springs which was recorded on the previous year's North American tour.

Background 
Despite relative success in North America in the early 1970s, Hawkwind's pull there had waned by the time of their 1978 tour, with no record contract and playing to audiences of around 500-600. Nevertheless, they retained a small cult following throughout the 1980s despite no tours and most albums being available only on import.

In September and October 1989 they ventured back for a 13 date low-key tour, part of which was released on the Palace Springs album. They followed this up with an 18 date tour in December 1990, relying upon dedicated fans to help with sound and lighting gear. One of these fans, Brad Knox, supervised the video recording of some shows, and in 1992 received permission from Brock to release a CD of an edited soundtrack from the 16 December 1990 Oakland Omni Theatre show.

Set list 
This CD starts part way through the show, "Void's End" being the end of "The Golden Void". Prior to that, the band opened the set list with either "Angels of Death" or "Needle Gun". "Wings" was also performed, but omitted from the CD.

Tour dates 
 28 November: Boston, Channel Club
 30 November: Philadelphia, Ambler
 1 December: New York, Wetlands
 2 December: Washington, 9:30 Club
 4 December: Toronto, Diamond
 5 December: Cleveland, Empire
 6 December: Cleveland, Empire
 7 December: Chicago, Cubby Bear
 8 December: River Grove, Thirsty Whale
 9 December: Milwaukee, Shank Hall
 11 December: Minneapolis, Glam Slam
 13 December: Denver, Mercury Club
 15 December: Los Angeles, Lingerie
 16 December: Oakland, Omni
 17 December: San Francisco, I – Beam
 19 December: Portland, Day For Night
 20 December: Vancouver, Town Pump
 22 December: Long Beach, Bogarts

Track listing 
 "Void's End" (Dave Brock) – 5:27
 "Ejection" (Robert Calvert) – 5:58
 "Brainstorm" (Nik Turner) – 8:51
 "Out Of The Shadows" (Doug Buckley, Brock, Alan Davey)"Eons" [aka "Snake Dance"] (Hawkwind)"Night Of The Hawks" (Brock) – 18:08
 "TV Suicide" (Harvey Bainbridge)"Back In The Box" (Hawkwind)"Assassins Of Allah" [aka "Hassan-i-Sabah"] (Calvert, Paul Rudolph) – 20:14
 "Propaganda" (Hawkwind) – 1:08
 "Reefer Madness" (Calvert, Brock) – 8:25

Cyclops release only:
 "Images" (Bridget Wishart, Brock, Davey) – 6:15

Personnel 
 Bridget Wishart – vocals
 Dave Brock – electric guitar, keyboards, vocals
 Alan Davey – bass guitar, vocals
 Harvey Bainbridge – keyboards, vocals
 Richard Chadwick – drums, vocals

References 

Hawkwind live albums
1992 live albums